Condrey is a surname. Notable people with the surname include:

Clay Condrey (born 1975), American baseball player
Dennis Condrey (born 1952), American wrestler
Fred Condrey (1883–1952), Welsh footballer
Seth Condrey (born 1983), American Christian musician